Orphean may refer to:

 Relating to Orpheus, a legendary musician, poet, and prophet in ancient Greek religion and myth
 Orphean warbler, a typical warbler of the genus Sylvia

See also

 Orpheus (disambiguation)